Taaw't Bato (Tau't Batu) is one of several closely related languages spoken on Palawan Island in the Philippines.

References

Palawanic languages
Languages of Palawan